The 2003 South Oxfordshire District Council election took place on 1 May 2003 to elect members of South Oxfordshire District Council, a non-metropolitan district council in Oxfordshire, England. This was part of the wider 2003 UK local elections. The whole council was up for election with boundary changes since the last election in 1999 reducing the number of seats by 2. The Conservative Party gained overall control of the council from no overall control.

Election result
The results saw the Conservatives take control from the Liberal Democrat and Labour coalition that had run the council before the election. This was the first time the Conservatives had controlled the council since 1995 and came after they made 5 gains to hold 27 of the 48 seats on the council. The Liberal Democrats lost eight seats, including the council chairman John Griffin in Crowmarsh ward and the council leader Jan Morgan. Meanwhile, Labour also lost three seats including the cabinet member for finance Nick Hards. However the Henley Residents Group gained seats, picking up all 4 seats for Henley. Overall turnout in the election was 35.13%, after voting hours had been extended in an attempt to increase turnout.

Ward results

References

2003
2003 English local elections
2000s in Oxfordshire